The 2003–04 Sheffield Shield season known as the Pura Cup was the 102nd season of the Sheffield Shield, the domestic first-class cricket competition of Australia. Victoria won the championship.

Table

Final

References

Sheffield Shield
Sheffield Shield
Sheffield Shield seasons